Auglaize Township, Ohio, may refer to:

Auglaize Township, Allen County, Ohio
Auglaize Township, Paulding County, Ohio

Ohio township disambiguation pages